2018 in television may refer to
 2018 in American television for television related events in the United States.
 List of 2018 American television debuts for television debut related events in the United States.
 2018 in Australian television for television related events in Australia.
 2018 in British television for television related events in Great Britain.
 2018 in Scottish television for television related events in Scotland.
 2018 in Canadian television for television related events in Canada.
 2018 in Estonian television for television related events in Estonia.
 2018 in Indian television for television related events in India.
 2018 in Tamil television for television related events in Tamil.
 2018 in Irish television for television related events in Ireland.
 2018 in Japanese television for television related events in Japan.
 2018 in Mexican television for television related events in Mexico.
 2018 in Philippine television for television related events in the Philippines.
 2018 in South African television for television related events in South Africa.
 2018 in South Korean television for television related events in South Korea.

 
Mass media timelines by year